Melica argyrea is a species of grass found in Argentina, Brazil (Rio Grande do Sul), and Uruguay.

Description
It has no lateral branches. Leaf-sheaths are tubular for majority of the length and can be scabrous. Leaf-blades could be either filiform or linear and sometimes even involute or convolute depending on the gender. As with leaf-sheaths the leaf-blades are also pilose but hairy sometimes on one side or on both (depending on the gender). The leaf-blade margins are always ciliated.

The main branches are spread out, with the panicle axis being scabrous just like the branches. Pedicels are curved, filiform, glabrous and have fertile spikelets on them. They carry 1 fertile floret which is callus and glabrous. It is also chartaceous and way thinner above and where margins are.

The palea keels are ciliolate while it surface is scaberulous. Glumes are thinner than fertile lemma and could exceed florets apex. It is also  length of upper glume and is membranous and thinner above. It is even much thinner on the margins. It has no keels but is 5-7 veined. The apex of the lower glume is erose and obtuse. Just like lower glume it doesn't have keels and is membranous, but have veins which are 3-5. The upper apex is either acute or obtuse.

Ecology
Melica argyrea is quite common in grasslands, but is almost rare in the mountains. Flowers bloom from August to November.

References

argyrea
Flora of Argentina
Flora of Brazil
Flora of Uruguay
Taxa named by Eduard Hackel